Abdulsalam Abdullah Mohammad (born 1965) is the current Provincial Council Chairman (PCC) of Al Anbar Province, Iraq. In December 2007, Dr. Abdullah presided over a joint meeting of the Anbar Provincial Council (PC) and the Council of Tribal Sheikhs as part of an outreach effort to the province's tribal leaders. It was the first PC meeting in Ramadi since November 2007, when the Iraq Awakening Council, Sahawa al-Iraq (SAI) had called for Abdulsalam's replacement as its chairman and suspended its activities. SAI leaders were invited, but did not attend.

References 

 

Al Anbar Governorate
Iraqi politicians
Living people
1965 births
University of Mosul alumni